Nils Gunnar Åsling (15 December 1927 – 12 August 2017) was a Swedish politician who served as Minister for Industry from 1976 to 1978, before returning to the post from 1979 to 1982.

Career
Åsling was born in Alsen, Sweden. He continued serving as a member of the Riksdag until 1988.

His son Per Åsling has also served on the Riksdag. Nils Åsling died in Stockholm at the age of 89 on 12 August 2017.

References

1927 births
2017 deaths
Members of the Riksdag from the Centre Party (Sweden)
Members of the Riksdag 1970–1973
Members of the Riksdag 1974–1976
Members of the Riksdag 1976–1979
Members of the Riksdag 1979–1982
Members of the Riksdag 1982–1985
Members of the Riksdag 1985–1988
20th-century Swedish people
People from Krokom Municipality